The Iercici (also Iercicu; Ciortoș or Valea Mare) is a left tributary of the river Apa Mare in Romania. It discharges into the Apa Mare near Becicherecu Mic.

References

Rivers of Romania
Rivers of Timiș County